Daryl Tyrone Wren (born January 25, 1967) is a former American football defensive back who played two seasons with the New England Patriots of the National Football League. He was drafted by the Buffalo Bills in the third round of the 1991 NFL Draft. He played college football at Pittsburg State University and attended Will Rogers High School in Tulsa, Oklahoma.

References

External links
Just Sports Stats

Living people
1967 births
Players of American football from Oklahoma
American football defensive backs
African-American players of American football
Pittsburg State Gorillas football players
New England Patriots players
Sportspeople from Tulsa, Oklahoma
21st-century African-American people
20th-century African-American sportspeople